Deborah Tucker is an actress who appeared in American television and film during the late-1980s and early-1990s.

Her first credited appearance as an actress was as a cast member of the short-lived television series Living Dolls in September 1989. She later appeared in episodes of Dallas, Picket Fences, the short-lived series If Not for You, Don't Tell Mom the Babysitter's Dead, Meatballs 4, Dr. Giggles and God's Not Dead: We the People.

Prior to her acting career, Deborah Tucker was the 1985 Ladies' Bronze Medalist in Figure skating at the Winter Universiade in Belluno, Italy.

External links

American film actresses
American television actresses
Living people
Year of birth missing (living people)
21st-century American women